Fiorella's Jack Stack Barbecue is a small chain of barbecue restaurants, catering, private dining facilities, and nationwide shipper of barbecue located in the metropolitan area of Kansas City, Missouri.

Early history

Fiorella's Jack Stack Barbecue was originally a part of the Fiorella family-owned chain of Smoke Stack Barbecue restaurants, with the original restaurant located in south Kansas City, Missouri on Prospect Avenue. Founded by family patriarch Russ Fiorella in 1957, it eventually opened four more restaurants for the Fiorella family. One of these, Smoke Stack Barbecue of Martin City, was opened in 1974 by the eldest son Jack Fiorella and his wife Delores. The restaurant briefly changed its name to Hatfield and McCoy's in the mid-1980s.

Expansion and name change

In the mid-1990s, Jack and Delores opened their second restaurant location by expanding into neighboring Overland Park, Kansas. They decided to change their name to Fiorella's Jack Stack Barbecue to set themselves apart from the family chain of Smoke Stack Barbecue restaurants. They also opened a full-service catering operation in Martin City, along with private dining facilities in both Martin City and in their third restaurant location in the historic Freight House building across from Union Station in mid-town Kansas City. In October 2006, they opened a fourth restaurant on The Country Club Plaza. A fifth location opened in Lee's Summit, Missouri early spring 2015.

Seizing upon the opportunity to expand their Kansas City-style barbecue beyond the borders of Kansas City, Fiorella's Jack Stack Barbecue began shipping their barbecue nationwide in 2000. Media exposure on The Food Network and Modern Marvels on The History Channel helped to introduce the rest of America to Jack Stack's Kansas City-style barbecue. Fiorella's Jack Stack has been rated as some of the best barbecue in the United States by several national organizations and magazines. Most notably, the Zagat Survey named it the "#1 Barbecue House in the Country."

Jack Fiorella has passed restaurant operations along to his son-in-law Case Dorman.

See also
 List of barbecue restaurants

References

External links
 

Barbecue restaurants in the United States
Restaurants in Kansas City, Missouri
Restaurants established in 1957
1957 establishments in Missouri